Egil Johansen (born 18 August 1954) is a Norwegian orienteering competitor, winner of the 1976 and 1978 Individual World Orienteering Championships, as well as getting silver medal in 1979. He was Relay World Champion in 1978 as a member of the Norwegian winning team, and also have a silver medal from 1976.

He won nine national championships (1975–1980) and has served as coach for the Norwegian national team (from 1992).

He has his education from the Norwegian School of Sport Sciences.

References

1954 births
Living people
Norwegian orienteers
Male orienteers
World Orienteering Championships medalists
Norwegian orienteering coaches
Norwegian School of Sport Sciences alumni
20th-century Norwegian people
21st-century Norwegian people